Kamareh-ye Bala (also Romanized as Kamareh-ye Bālā; also known as Kamareh-ye ‘Olyā, Kamereh, and Kemereh) is a village in Oshtorinan Rural District, Oshtorinan District, Borujerd County, Lorestan Province, Iran. The village has a decling population from the 2006 census, where there were 260 people, in sixty-six families, to the 2016 census of 183 people, in sixty-four families.

References 

Towns and villages in Borujerd County